The San Patricio Church massacre was the mass murder of three priests and two seminarians of the Pallottine order on July 4, 1976, during the Dirty War, at St. Patrick's Church, located in the Belgrano neighborhood of the Buenos Aires, Argentina. The victims were priests Alfredo Leaden, Alfredo Kelly, and Pedro Duffau and seminarians Salvador Barbeito and Emilio Barletti. The murders were ordered by Argentine Navy Rear Admiral Ruben Chamorro.

The crime 
At approximately 1:00 a.m. on Sunday , three youths, Luis Pinasco, Guillermo Silva, and Julio Víctor Martínez, watched as two cars parked in front of the church of San Patricio.
As the son of a soldier, Martínez thought it might be part of an assassination attempt on his father, so he went to Police Station No. 37 to make a report.
Minutes later, a police car arrived on the scene and officer Miguel Ángel Romano spoke with people who were suspects in the case.
At 2:00am Silva and Pinasco saw a group of people with rifles getting out of the cars and moving into the church.
Later in the morning, at the time of the first Mass, a group of worshippers waiting in front of the church found the door closed.

Surprised by the situation, Fernando Savino, an organist from the parish decided to enter through a window and found on the first floor the bodies of the five religious riddled with bullets, and lined-up face down in a pool of blood on a red carpet.
The murderers had written with chalk on a door:

They also wrote on a carpet:

On the body of Salvador Barbeito the murderers placed a cartoon by Quino, taken from one of the rooms, in which Mafalda appears pointing to a policeman's baton saying:  ("This is the ideology-denting stick").

The following day, the newspaper La Nación published a story about the slaughter which included the text of a communiqué from Area Command I of the Army that read:

Testimony before the CONADEP Commission in 1984 indicated that the San Patricio Church murders were carried out by members of the Argentine Navy on the orders of Rear Admiral Ruben Chamorro, head of Navy Petty-Officers School of Mechanics (ESMA).

Cause for beatification
The superior general of the Pallottine fathers in Argentina, Bishop Seamus Freeman sought out Fr. Jorge Bergoglio for support in the campaign for beatification for those killed in the attack. 

In 2005, Cardinal Bergoglio, who subsequently became Pope Francis, authorised the request for beatification.

See also
List of massacres in Argentina

References

Further reading

External links
In English:
The Massacre at St. Patrick’s International Memorial
In Spanish:
El caso de los padres palotinos, Informe Nunca Más, CONADEP, 1985
A treinta años de la masacre de San Patricio, por Eduardo Kimel, Página 12, 2 de julio de 2006
Monumento a los padres palotinos, Clarín, 2 de julio de 2006
Kirchner y Bergoglio, juntos en una misa de homenaje a sacerdotes palotinos, Clarín, 11 de abril de 2006
29 años de la Masacre de San Patricio, Argenpress, 4 de julio de 2005
Mártires Palotinos, por Cármen Lynch, Comisión Permanente para la Memoria de los Mártires Palotinos
Masacre de San Patricio - Compilación de artículos
“4 de julio – La masacre de San Patricio” – Documental sobre los asesinatos del 4 de julio de 1976, archive version - IMDB
 Trailer (no subtitles) on YouTube
 Full movie (w/ English subtitles) as a 10-part playlist on YouTube

1976 murders in Argentina
1976 in Argentina
1976 in Christianity
Argentine Servants of God
Attacks on churches in South America
Deaths by firearm in Argentina
Dirty War
False flag operations
July 1976 events in South America
Mass murder in 1976
Massacres committed by Argentina
Massacres in 1976
Massacres in Argentina
Pallottines